The Weida is a non-navigable river in eastern Thuringia, Germany, left tributary of the White Elster. Most of its course is situated in the district of Greiz.

The Weida's source is near Pausa in Saxony; it then flows through the Thuringian Highland passing Zeulenroda-Triebes and through the eponymous Weida. It then feeds into the White Elster near Wünschendorf/Elster. Its tributaries include the Auma and the Leuba.

Rivers of Thuringia
Rivers of Germany